The following article contains statistics for the 2013 CECAFA Cup, which took place in Kenya from 27 November to 12 December 2013. Goals scored from penalty shoot-outs are not counted.

Goalscorers

5 goals

  Salah Ibrahim

3 goals

  Jockins Atudo
  Allan Wanga
  Ronald Kampamba
  Festus Mbewe

2 goals

  Mrisho Ngasa
  Mbwana Samatta
  Emmanuel Okwi
  Dan Sserunkuma
  Bornwell Mwape

1 goal

  Fiston Abdul Razak
  Christophe Nduwarugira
  Fasika Asfaw
  Saladin Bargicho
  Biruk Kalbore
  Yonathan Kebede
  Yussuf Saleh
  Jacob Keli
  Clifton Miheso
  David Owino
  Michel Ndahinduka
  Richard Justin Lado
  Fabiano Lako
  Moaaz Abdelraheem
  Muhannad El Tahir
  Haruna Chanongo
  Said Morad
  Khalid Aucho
  Hamis Kiiza
  Martin Kayongo-Mutumba
  Awadh Juma Issa
  Abdi Kassim
  Adeyum Saleh

1 own goal
  Saladin Bargicho (playing against Sudan)

Scoring

Wins and losses

Disciplinary record

By team

By individual

Overall statistics
Bold numbers indicate maximum values in each column.

See also
 2013 CECAFA Cup schedule

References

statistics